"Feelings" is a song recorded by American singer and songwriter Hayley Kiyoko for her first album Expectations. The song was released with a music video as the second single from Expectations on October 19, 2017, although the album itself was not announced at the time of the single's release.

Composition

"Feelings" is written by Kiyoko, Brandon Colbein, Nick Bailey, Jonathan Dorr, Cecil Bernardy, and Katherine Ostenberg. Similar to her other work, the song aims to normalize lesbian relationships in a heteronormative society. She wanted fans to be reminded of the feeling of a first crush.

Music video

A music video, directed by Kiyoko, was released concurrently with the single. As of January 2020, the video has garnered over 20 million views. The video stars Kiyoko chasing after a love interest, a girl named Desi, played by Alexandra Rodriguez. Reception to the video was positive, making it one of her most successful music videos at the time. Kiyoko aimed to show her playful side while acting in the video, and the video ended up being one of her favorite ones to make. The video was shot in one take.

References 

2017 singles
2017 songs
Atlantic Records singles
Electropop songs
Hayley Kiyoko songs
LGBT-related songs
Songs written by Nick Bailey
Empire Distribution singles